The Hyde County Courthouse is a historic courthouse building located at Swan Quarter, Hyde County, North Carolina.  It was built in 1854–1855, and is a two-story, "T"-shaped stuccoed brick building.   It has a Victorian style corbelled mousetooth cornice and ornately turned brackets.  The courthouse was remodeled in 1878 and 1909 and drastically renovated in 1964.

It was listed on the National Register of Historic Places in 1979.

References

External links
 Friends of Hyde County's Historic 1854 Courthouse

County courthouses in North Carolina
Courthouses on the National Register of Historic Places in North Carolina
Government buildings completed in 1855
Buildings and structures in Hyde County, North Carolina
National Register of Historic Places in Hyde County, North Carolina